Newtown Park is a multi-purpose stadium in Wellington, New Zealand, owned and managed by Wellington City Council. It is currently used mostly for football (soccer) matches in winter, and athletic events in summer. Newtown Park is the primary athletics stadium for the Wellington region.

Bookings of the venue are managed by the owner, Wellington City Council.  The council grants priority to the Wellington United Football club for weekend bookings during the winter season, and priority to Athletics Wellington for weekend bookings during the summer season, and for weekdays outside of school hours.

The main arena has a 400-metre, all-weather rubberized athletics track around it, as well as the spectator stands and the corporate lounge. A second, rectangular pitch (Newtown Park 2) is located to the south of the main arena.

History
Newtown Park was built in 1881 and was part of Wellington Zoo. The first match played there was an international rugby game where Wellington beat New South Wales 14–2 drawing 5,000 spectators including then Governor Sir James Prendergast. It was the main ground for Rugby in Wellington until Athletic Park was opened in 1896. Newtown Park has also been used to house New Zealand Troops before they departed for the Boer War, World War I and World War II.

The #1 pitch was re-developed in 2011 to function as a training venue for teams competing in the 2011 Rugby World Cup. During the tournament, football events were relocated to other venues.

Newtown Park was selected as one of the Wellington training venues for use by national representative teams during the 2023 FIFA Women's World Cup. As part of preparations for hosting these events, the Wellington City Council committed to improvements of the Newtown Park facilities, including renovation of both turf fields, the installation of floodlights in the main arena, and upgrades of the showers and changing rooms.

Football
Events at Newtown Park are organised by Wellington United during the winter football season.

The second pitch, was used by A-League franchise Wellington Phoenix for training and minor exhibition matches before they moved to Martin Luckie Park and then out to Fraser Park in Lower Hutt.

Other football events hosted

 1925, 1927, 1989 and 2012 finals of the Chatham Cup.
 2007 Women's National League Final.
 2008 Sichuan earthquake relief match - exhibition between Wellington Phoenix United and Christchurch Chinese Community.
 2008 Pre-Olympic Exhibition match - New Zealand Under-23 vs Chile Under-23

Athletics
Newtown Park is the main venue for regional track and field meets managed by Athletics Wellington during the summer season.

In January 2022, the North Island Colgate Games for children aged 7–14 were held at Newtown Park, with 1,200 athletes taking part.

School athletics events held at Newtown Park include the McEvedy Shield competition, an annual athletics series between four Wellington boys schools. It is also used by many other schools, and school sports associations as a place to stage in-house athletics events.

The Kiwi Athletic Club has their base at Newtown Park.

Other events at Newtown Park
Newtown Park also occasionally serves as a community events centre for the surrounding area, and has hosted cultural events such as Carols by Candlelight.

References

External links
 Archival post-card of Newtown Park, circa 1906
 Athletics Wellington
 Wellington United AFC
 Kiwi Athletic Club

1881 establishments in New Zealand
Association football venues in New Zealand
Sports venues in Wellington City
Multi-purpose stadiums in New Zealand